Odontoglaja is a genus of sea slugs, marine opisthobranch gastropod mollusks in the family Aglajidae.

Species
Species in the genus Odontoglaja include :
 Odontoglaja guamensis Rudman, 1978
 Odontoglaja mosaica Gosliner, 2011
 Odontoglaja sabadiega (Ortea, Moro & Espinosa, 1997)

References

 Gosliner T.M. (2011) Six new species of aglajid opisthobranch mollusks from the tropical Indo-Pacific. Zootaxa 2751: 1–24. page(s): 18

Aglajidae